CLCD may refer to:
Commodore LCD
Center for Leadership, Citizenship and Democracy
Children's Literature Comprehensive Database